Charlotte Weekly is  a weekly newspaper based in Charlotte, North Carolina.  It is now called the South Charlotte Weekly.

See also
 List of newspapers published in North Carolina

References

Weekly newspapers published in North Carolina
Mass media in Charlotte, North Carolina